David Wishart may refer to:
David S. Wishart (born 1961), Canadian bioinformatician 
D. M. G. Wishart (1928–2003), British statistician